Ole Marius Ingvaldsen (born 2 October 1985) is a Norwegian ski jumper.

In January 2008 he recorded his best placement in the Continental Cup, with a second place in Sapporo. He made his debut in the World Cup in December 2008 in Trondheim, where he finished 45th. He first finished among the top 30 in the World Cup with a 20th place from December 2010 in Lillehammer.

He hails from Steinkjer, and represents Steinkjer SK.

References

1985 births
Living people
Norwegian male ski jumpers
People from Steinkjer
Sportspeople from Trøndelag